Aale Maria Tynni-Haavio (3 October 1913 – 21 October 1997) was a Finnish poet and translator. She is best known for editing and translating European poetry ranging from the Middle Ages into Finnish in a comprehensive anthology of entitled Tuhat Laulujen Vuotta in (1957). She participated in the Art Competitions of the 1948 Summer Olympics in London, and won the Gold Medal in the Lyric Works, Literature category for "Laurel of Hellas".

Biography
Tynni was born in Ingria into an Ingrian Finnish family. She married fellow poet Martti Haavio, her second husband, in 1960. After he died in 1973, Tynni and Katariina Eskola compiled his notes and correspondence, which were later released as a series of books.

She is buried in the Hietaniemi Cemetery in Helsinki.

Works

 Kynttiläsydän, 1938
 Vesilintu, 1940
 Lähde ja matkamies, 1943
 Lehtimaja, 1946
 Soiva metsä, 1947
 Ylitse vuorten lasisten, 1949
 Tuntematon puu, 1952
 Kerttu ja Perttu ja muut talon lapset, 1953
 Kissa liukkaalla jäällä ja muita satuja, 1954
 Torni virrassa, 1954
 Vieraana vihreällä saarella, 1954
 Heikin salaisuudet, 1956
 Tuhat laulujen vuotta, 1957
 Yhdeksän kaupunkia, 1958
 Maailmanteatteri, 1961
 Muuttohaukat, 1965 
 Balladeja ja romansseja, 1967
 Lasten paratiisi, 1968
 Pidä rastaan laulusta kiinni, 1969
 Tarinain lähde, 1974
 Olen vielä kaukana, 1978
 Vuodenajat, 1987
 Inkeri, Inkerini, 1990
 Rautamarskin aika, 1991 (näytelmä)

References

External links

 
 Medal winners in Literary Events at the Olympics
 Aale Tynni in 375 humanists 16.03.2015, Faculty of Arts, University of Helsinki

1913 births
1997 deaths
People from Gatchinsky District
People from Tsarskoselsky Uyezd
20th-century Finnish poets
Finnish translators
Finnish literary critics
Finnish women literary critics
Finnish women poets
20th-century women writers
20th-century translators
Olympic gold medalists in art competitions
Medalists at the 1948 Summer Olympics
Burials at Hietaniemi Cemetery
Translators of the Poetic Edda
People of Ingrian Finnish descent
Olympic competitors in art competitions